Fear Factor: Khatron Ke Khiladi Kabhi Peeda, Kabhi Keeda is the seventh season of Fear Factor: Khatron Ke Khiladi, an Indian reality and stunt television series, aired from 31 January 2016 to 3 April 2016 on Colors TV. The series was produced by Endemol Shine India. The season was hosted by Arjun Kapoor and shot in Argentina. Sidharth Shukla emerged as the winner of the season and Sana Saeed became the runner-up.

Contestants

Elimination chart

 Winner
 1st Runner Up
 2nd Runner Up
 Finalists
 Ticket To Finale
 Lost Task
 Won First Task
 Was Safe from Elimination stunt
 Was Saved by his/her team for elimination
 Was nominated by his/her team for elimination
 Bottom Position
 Saved
 Eliminated
 Wild Card Entry
 Injury/Health Hault
 N/A
 Voluntary exit

References

External links

2016 Indian television seasons
07
Colors TV original programming